HD 51799 is a class M1III (red giant) star in the constellation Puppis. Its apparent magnitude is 4.95 and it is approximately 860 light years away based on parallax.

References

Puppis
M-type giants
CD-48 2601
033357
2608
051799
Suspected variables